Tribano is a comune (municipality) in the Province of Padua in the Italian region Veneto, located about  southwest of Venice and about  south of Padua.

The municipality of Tribano contains the frazioni (subdivisions, mainly villages and hamlets) Olmo and San Luca.

Tribano borders the following municipalities: Anguillara Veneta, Bagnoli di Sopra, Conselve, Monselice, Pozzonovo, San Pietro Viminario.

Demographic evolution

References

External links
 www.comuneditribano.com

Cities and towns in Veneto